Néma is a department of Hodh Ech Chargui Region in Mauritania.

See also
Diade

References 

Departments of Mauritania